Moch is an islet of the Satawan Atoll and a municipality in the state of Chuuk, Federated States of Micronesia. The island covers an area approximately 0.28 square km (32.58 ha), and supports a population of around 700 people.

References

Statoids.com, retrieved December 8, 2010

Municipalities of Chuuk State
Islands of Chuuk State